Broadview was a territorial electoral district for the Legislative Assembly of Northwest Territories, Canada.

The riding was created by royal proclamation in 1883 and abolished in 1888 when the electoral districts were redistributed under the North-West Representation Act after it passed through the Parliament of Canada in 1888.

Members of the Legislative Assembly (MLAs)

Election results

1883 election

1885 election

References

External links 
Website of the Legislative Assembly of Northwest Territories

Former electoral districts of Northwest Territories